Stražnji Vrh is a settlement west of Črnomelj in the White Carniola area of southeastern Slovenia. The area is part of the traditional region of Lower Carniola and is now included in the Southeast Slovenia Statistical Region.

The local church is dedicated to Saint Nicholas and belongs to the Parish of Črnomelj. It is a small Romanesque church that was refurbished in the Baroque style in the 17th century.

References

External links
Stražnji Vrh on Geopedia

Populated places in the Municipality of Črnomelj